Eric Stanley Lock,  (19 April 1919 – 3 August 1941) was a British Royal Air Force (RAF) fighter pilot and flying ace of the Second World War.

Born in Shrewsbury in 1919, Lock had his first experience of flying as a teenager. In the late 1930s with war a possibility and the likely event of him being called to arms, Lock decided that he would prefer to fight as an airman. He joined the RAF in 1939. He completed his training in 1940 and was posted to No. 41 Squadron RAF in time for the Battle of Britain. Lock became the RAF's most successful Allied pilot during the battle, shooting down 21 German aircraft and sharing in the destruction of one.

After the Battle of Britain Lock served on the Channel Front, flying offensive sweeps over France. Lock went on to bring his overall total to 26 aerial victories, one shared destroyed and eight probable in 25 weeks of operational sorties over a one-year period, during which time he was hospitalised for six months. Included in his victory total were 20 German fighter aircraft, 18 of them Messerschmitt Bf 109s. In mid-1941 Lock was promoted to the rank of flight lieutenant.

Lock earned the nickname "Sawn Off Lockie", because of his extremely short stature. Within less than six months of becoming one of the most famous RAF pilots in the country, he crash-landed in the English Channel after his Supermarine Spitfire was damaged by ground-fire. Lock was posted missing in action. He was never seen again.

Early life and career
Eric Stanley Lock was born in 1919 to a farming and quarrying family, whose home was in the rural Shropshire village of Bayston Hill. He was privately educated at Prestfelde School, Shrewsbury. On his 14th birthday his father treated him to a five-shilling, 15-minute flight with Sir Alan Cobham's Air Circus. Unlike most teenagers, Lock was unimpressed by flying and had soon lost interest. At 16 he left school and joined his father's business.

In 1939 he made the decision that if there was going to be a war, he wanted to be a fighter pilot, and so immediately joined the Royal Air Force Volunteer Reserve. Within three months Lock had been called up and began flight training. On the outbreak of war in September 1939, as a trained pilot Lock joined the RAF as a sergeant pilot. After further training at No.6 Flying School RAF Little Rissington, he was commissioned as a pilot officer (Service Number 81642) and posted to No. 41 Squadron at RAF Catterick, North Yorkshire, flying Spitfires.

Lock completed his training in late May 1940. Officially qualified as a fighter pilot, he was posted to No. 41 Squadron at RAF Catterick as acting pilot officer. Lock spent several weeks with his squadron before taking two weeks leave pass in July 1940 to marry his girlfriend Peggy Meyers, a former "Miss Shrewsbury". Lock returned to his unit and soon began combat patrols over the North of England, defending British airspace against Luftflotte 5 (Air Fleet 5) based in Norway. Lock was bored by the patrols as it involved chasing lone enemy raiders without success.

Second World War

Battle of Britain
The Battle of Britain began in July 1940 with the Luftwaffe making attacks on British shipping in the English Channel and Britain's East Coast. In August RAF Fighter Command's bases came under attack as the Germans attempted to establish air superiority over southern England. The battles grew larger in scale, but 41 Squadron, based in the north, were well clear of the main combat zone and saw little action for the first four weeks of the German air offensive.

Lock's frustration ended on 15 August 1940. On this date the Luftwaffe attempted to stretch Fighter Command by launching a wave of aircraft against targets in northern England where German intelligence believed there to be little opposition. It was in this battle Lock gained his first victory. The Squadron was ordered into line-astern formation and made an attack. In the first attack Lock followed his Section Leader. In the second he had an opportunity to fire at a Bf 110 heavy fighter. After two short bursts the starboard engine caught fire. Lock was going to claim only a probable, but another No. 41 pilot saw it crash into Seaham Harbour and confirmed his victory. Lock soon attacked the Ju 88s, downing one of their number.

In light of Fighter Command's need for units in the south of the country, No. 41 Squadron was redeployed to RAF Hornchurch in Essex on 3 September 1940. On 5 September, Lock flew as Red 2, positioned behind and protecting the Squadron's Leader. He shot down two Heinkel He 111s over the Thames Estuary. One of his victims crashed into a river, the other caught fire and its undercarriage fell down. Lock followed it down. He quickly realised his mistake—reducing height to pursue a damaged enemy put a pilot at risk from enemy fighters—but it was too late. A Messerschmitt Bf 109 attacked him and he sustained damage to his Spitfire and a wound to his leg. Lock immediately zoom-climbed. The Bf 109 attempted to follow but the pilot stalled and fell away. Lock reversed direction and dived. Waiting for the German fighter to come out of its dive he fired several short bursts and it exploded. Looking around he saw the second He 111 land in the English Channel, about ten miles from the first. Lock circled above the He 111 and noticing a boat he alerted the boat to its presence by flying over it and led the vessel to the crash site. As he left the scene he saw the crew surrendering to the occupants of the boat. On the way home he saw his first victim in the river, with a dinghy nearby. A further Bf 109 was claimed destroyed on that date.

The following day, despite pain from his leg and against medical advice, Lock claimed his seventh victory, a Ju 88 off Dover at 09:00. On 9 September he claimed two Bf 109s destroyed over Kent and he followed the success with two victories—over a Ju 88 and Bf 110—on 11 September 1940. The victory brought his tally to nine enemy aircraft destroyed, eight of them in less than seven days. He was awarded the Distinguished Flying Cross (DFC). The award was gazetted on 1 October 1940 with a citation reading:

Lock continued to shoot enemy aircraft down regularly. On 14 September he recorded two victories over Bf 109s and the following day shared in the destruction of a Dornier Do 17 before destroying a Bf 109 on 15 September 1940—the Battle of Britain Day—over Clacton-on-Sea. Two rest days followed. On 18 September he claimed a Bf 109 probably destroyed on his first patrol then another destroyed plus one probably destroyed in the afternoon over Gravesend.

On 20 September he filed a curious report that saw him attack three "Heinkel He 113s", shooting down one and forcing the others to flee back to France. During that sortie he sighted a Henschel Hs 126 which he pursued across the English Channel before finally downing it over the German gun batteries at Boulogne-sur-Mer. Upon landing he was told by his commanding officer that he had been awarded a Medal bar to his DFC for 15 victories in 16 days. Published on 22 October 1940, the citation read:

No. 41 Squadron's pilots were placed on four weeks' rotation rest following the intense period of operational sorties, returning to RAF Hornchurch in early October 1940. Lock immediately commenced where he had left off. On 5 October he was credited with another Bf 109 with two probables over Kent; on 9 October another Bf 109 was claimed 10 miles from Dover and a probable followed seconds later. Off Dungeness he dispatched yet another Bf 109 on 11 October then on 20 October 1940 shot down a Bf 109 directly above RAF Biggin Hill. This victory brought his total to 20, making Lock a "Quadruple Ace". On 25 October Lock destroyed a Bf 109 to bring his tally to 21 aerial victories. The Battle of Britain ended on 31 October 1940 and Lock, with 21 enemy aircraft destroyed, was the most successful Allied ace of the campaign.

Channel Front
On 8 November 1940 his Spitfire was badly damaged during a skirmish with several Bf 109s over Beachy Head in East Sussex. The Spitfire was so badly damaged that Lock crash-landed in a ploughed field, but was able to walk away. On 17 November 1940 No. 41 Squadron attacked a formation of 70 Bf 109s that were top cover for a bomber raid on London. After shooting down one Bf 109, and setting another on fire, Lock's Spitfire was hit by a volley of cannon shells, which severely injured Lock's right arm and both legs. The rounds also knocked the throttle permanently open by severing the control lever. At  he began to descend and with little control and no means of slowing the fighter down, he could not execute a safe landing; being too badly injured to parachute to safety, Lock was in a perilous situation.

Lying in the aircraft for some two hours, he was found by two patrolling British Army soldiers and carried two miles (3 km) on an improvised stretcher made of their Enfield rifles and Army issue winter coats—made after instruction from Lock. By this point, Lock had lost so much blood that he was unconscious, and so unable to feel the additional pain of being dropped three times, once into a dyke of water. After being transferred to the Princess Mary's Hospital at RAF Halton, he was awarded the Distinguished Service Order (DSO) on 17 December 1940. The citation read:

Lock underwent fifteen separate operations over the following three months to remove shrapnel and other metal fragments from his wounds. For the following three months he remained at Halton recuperating from his injuries, leaving on only one occasion to travel on crutches and in full uniform to Buckingham Palace, where King George VI presented him with his DSO, DFC and Bar. He was also Mentioned in Despatches in March 1941.

Last battles and death
Lock spent several months in hospital. He stayed at the Royal Masonic Hospital with Richard Hillary, another Battle of Britain ace. They were operated on by the pioneering plastic surgeon Archibald McIndoe. While there, Hillary wrote his memoirs The Last Enemy, before his death in a flying accident on 8 January 1943. He remembered Lock having Sulfapyridine treatment and being "vociferous". The nurses wore anti-infection masks and gloves, and Eric, "with an amiable grin" would curse them for it "from dawn till dusk".

In June 1941 he received notification that he had been promoted to flying officer and was requested to report back for immediate flying duty with No. 41 Squadron. Four weeks later he was promoted again to flight lieutenant and posted to No. 611 Squadron in command of B Flight. In July 1941 he gained three victories against Bf 109s flying offensive sweeps over France—on 6 July at 15:00, on 8 July at 06:30 and 11:00 on 14 July near Le Touquet.

On 3 August 1941, Lock was returning from a fighter "Rhubarb" when he spotted a column of German troops and vehicles on a road near the Pas-de-Calais. Signalling the attack to his wingman, Lock was seen to peel off from the formation and prepare for the ground strafing attack—the last time he was seen. He is believed to have been shot down by ground-fire. Neither his body or his Spitfire Mk V, W3257, have ever been found, despite a thorough search of the area in the years following the war by both the RAF and the Commonwealth War Graves Commission.

Lock was the first of three successful RAF aces who were shot down during this period: Douglas Bader was shot down in error and taken prisoner on 9 August 1941; Robert Stanford Tuck's Spitfire was hit by enemy ground-based flak near Boulogne-sur-Mer on 28 January 1942 and he was forced to crash land and taken prisoner. In July 1942, Paddy Finucane was lost in similar circumstances to Lock.

It has been suggested by writer Dilip Sakar that Lock was shot down by the German ace Oberleutnant Johann Schmid from Jagdgeschwader 26 near Calais since he was the only German pilot to make a claim. However, Lock was posted missing on an early morning sortie. The war diary for JG 26 shows that Schmid made his claim at 18:32 in the evening and that the location of his claim was not listed in Schmid's combat report.

Memorials

Lock's name is carved in Panel 29 on the Runnymede Memorial along with the 20,400 other British and Commonwealth airmen who were posted missing in action during the war. A new road was named after him in Bayston Hill, Shropshire where his family's former home lies, as well as the members' bar at the Shropshire Aero Club based at a former wartime airfield, RAF Sleap.

There is also a stained glass memorial to him in Bayston Hill Memorial Hall, as well as a brass memorial plaque in Condover Parish Church. and another in the school chapel at Prestfelde donated by the Battle of Britain Historical Society.

Lock is named as a member of the Guinea Pig Club (made up of patients of Archibald McIndoe) on a Roll of Honour at Queen Victoria Hospital, East Grinstead, Sussex.

List of victories
Lock was credited with 26 air victories and eight probable victories. The total included 17 Bf 109s, one "Heinkel He 113" (probably a Bf 109), one Henschel Hs 126, two Bf 110s, two He 111s, two Ju 88s and a Do 17 destroyed.

Notes

References
Baker, E.C.R (1962). The Fighter Aces of the RAF. William Kimber. No ISBN.
Bishop, Patrick (2004). Fighter Boys: Saving Britain 1940. Harper Perennial. . 
 Brew, Steve (2016). A Ruddy Awful Waste: Eric Lock DSO, DFC & Bar; The Brief Life of a Battle of Britain Fighter Ace. Fighting High, London. 
Foreman, John (1988). Battle of Britain: the forgotten months, November and December 1940. Air Research Publications, London.  
Foreman, John (2003). RAF Fighter Command Victory Claims of World War Two: Part One, 1939–1940. Red Kite. .
Foreman, John (2005). RAF Fighter Command Victory Claims of World War Two: Part Two, 1 January 1941 – 30 June 1943. Red Kite. . 
Franks, Norman (1980). Wings of Freedom: Twelve Battle of Britain Pilots. London: William Kimber. .
Franks, Norman (1997). Royal Air Force Fighter Command Losses of the Second World War. Volume 1: Operational Losses: Aircraft and Crews, 1939–1941. Hersham, Surrey, Midland Publishing. .
Hillary, Richard. (2010). The Last Enemy. Vintage Ltd, London.  
Mason, Francis (1969). Battle Over Britain. London: McWhirter Twins Ltd. .
Price, Alfred (1990). Battle of Britain Day: 15 September 1940. Greenhill books. London.  
Price, Alfred (1996). Spitfire Mark I/II Aces 1939–41. Osprey Publishing. .
Price, Alfred. (1997). Spitfire Mark V Aces 1941–1945. Osprey Publishing. . 
Robinson, Anthony (1987). RAF Fighter Squadrons in the Battle of Britain. Arms and Armour. 
Sarkar, Dilip. (2010). How the Spitfire Won the Battle of Britain. Amberley Publishing. 
Shores, Christopher (1983). Air Aces. Presidio Press. 
Shores, Christopher and Williams, Clive. (1994). Aces High. Grub Street. 
Shores, Christopher and Williams, Clive. (1966). Aces High. Neville Spearman. No ISBN.
Smith, Richard C. Hornchurch Scramble: The Definitive Account of the RAF Fighter Airfield, Its Pilots, Groundcrew and Staff from 1915 to the End of the Battle of Britain: Vol 1 (Paperback) – Pub: Grub Street (26 November 2002), 
Shropshire County Archives. (1979). Eric Lock—A Shropshire Airman (privately published and now out-of-print pamphlet)
Shropshire Archives, The Story of a Brave Shropshire Airman: a tribute to Flight Lieutenant Eric Stanley Lock

External links

BBC Shropshire Bio on Eric Lock
Military Aviation talk page about Eric Lock
Bio – Eric Lock at Waffen HQ in German

Military personnel from Shrewsbury
Royal Air Force officers
British World War II flying aces
Companions of the Distinguished Service Order
Royal Air Force personnel killed in World War II
1919 births
1941 deaths
Royal Air Force Volunteer Reserve personnel of World War II
The Few
Recipients of the Distinguished Flying Cross (United Kingdom)
Missing in action of World War II
Aviators killed by being shot down
Aerial disappearances of military personnel in action
Members of the Guinea Pig Club